The Defensive Player of the Year Award is given annually to the National Lacrosse League player (not goaltenders) who is chosen as the best defensive player.

Past winners

References

Defenseman